Nafia Kuş (born February 20, 1995) is a European champion Turkish female taekwondo practitioner competing in the heavyweight division.

Career 
Kuş is a native of Adana, Turkey. She has been performing taekwondo since age 8. Currently, Kuş is studying Physical Education and Sports at Çukurova University in Adana.

In 2013, she obtained the silver medal at the Islamic Solidarity Games held in Palembang, Indonesia. Kuş won the silver medal at the 2014 World University Taekwondo Championships in Hohhot, China. She became gold medalist at the European Junior Championship in Innsbruck, Austria in 2014, and continued her success by winning another gold medals at tournaments in 2015 including Dutch Open in Antalya, and Moldova Open in Chisinau.

She won the gold medal at the 1st ETU European Championships Olympic weight categories held in Nalchik, Russia in 2015. Nafia Kuş won a bronze medal at the 2015 World Taekwondo Championships held in Chelyabinsk, Russia. She won the gold medal in the +73 kg division at the 2015 Dutch Open Tournament in Eindhoven. At the 2020 German Open Tournament in Hamburg, she became gold medalist in the +73 kg division. Kuş took the gold medal in the -73 kg division at the 8th Turkish Open Tournament held in Istanbul.

She won the gold medal in the women's +67 kg event at the 2022 Mediterranean Games held in Oran, Algeria.

Tournament record

References

External links
 

1995 births
Living people
Sportspeople from Adana
Turkish female taekwondo practitioners
Turkish female martial artists
Competitors at the 2018 Mediterranean Games
Competitors at the 2022 Mediterranean Games
Mediterranean Games gold medalists for Turkey
Mediterranean Games bronze medalists for Turkey
Mediterranean Games medalists in taekwondo
Medalists at the 2019 Summer Universiade
Universiade gold medalists for Turkey
Universiade medalists in taekwondo
European Taekwondo Championships medalists
World Taekwondo Championships medalists
Taekwondo practitioners at the 2020 Summer Olympics
Olympic taekwondo practitioners of Turkey
21st-century Turkish women
Islamic Solidarity Games medalists in taekwondo
Islamic Solidarity Games competitors for Turkey